Li Zhuhong (李柱宏 Lǐ Zhùhóng, born 22 October 1983 in Zhuanglang, Gansu) is a Chinese long-distance runner who specializes in the marathon.

He won the 2002 Beijing Marathon. He competed at the 2004 Summer Olympics and the 2007 World Championships. He finished a disappointing 51st in the 2008 Summer Olympics with a time of 	2:24:08.

Achievements

Personal bests
5000 metres - 13:41.44 min (2001)
10,000 metres - 29:17.43 min (2001)
Half marathon - 1:06:02 hrs (2002)
Marathon - 2:10:46 hrs (2001)

References

Team China 2008

1983 births
Living people
Athletes (track and field) at the 2004 Summer Olympics
Athletes (track and field) at the 2008 Summer Olympics
Chinese male long-distance runners
Chinese male marathon runners
Olympic athletes of China
People from Pingliang
Runners from Gansu